Yiğitcan Saybir (born February 27, 1999) is a Turkish professional basketball player who plays as a power forward for Frutti Extra Bursaspor of the Turkish Basketbol Süper Ligi (BSL) and the EuroCup.

References

External links
Yiğitcan Saybir Euroleague.net Profile
Yiğitcan Saybir TBLStat.net Profile
Yiğitcan Saybir Eurobasket Profile
Yiğitcan Saybir TBL Profile

Living people
1999 births
Anadolu Efes S.K. players
Basketball players from Istanbul
Bursaspor Basketbol players
Power forwards (basketball)
Turkish men's basketball players